The ruins of the Wilsontown Ironworks are located near the village of Forth in Lanarkshire in Scotland, approximately  to the south east of Glasgow. The works were founded by the three Wilson brothers in 1779, and operated until 1842. The works had two blast furnaces, and in 1790 a forge was added. Later a rolling and slitting mill and additional forging hammers were installed. In its heyday the works employed 2,000 people. The village later had a railway branch line from Wilsontown to Auchengray railway station on the Caledonian Railway. This remained open for some years after the demise of the iron works and served several collieries in the area.

It was at the Wilsontown Ironworks that James Beaumont Neilson developed the first hot blast form of the blast furnace, which he patented in 1828.

Coal was produced at Wilsontown besides iron.  When the ironworks closed, coal continued to be mined, and  production did not finally cease until 1955.

The buildings were cleared after closure, but the general layout of the site can still be discerned and a heritage trail has been created. The core of the site is legally protected. It has been designated a Scheduled Ancient Monument since 1968. In 2007 Forestry Commission Scotland, the present owners of the site, launched a project to raise public awareness of the Wilsontown Ironworks.

Wilsontown features in the drinking song We're Nae Awa' Tae Bide Awa':
As I was walking through Wilson toon
I met wee Johnie Scobie
Says he tae me "Can ye gaun a half
Says I, "Man, that's my hobby."

CHORUS: For we're no awa', etc.

References

External links
Forestry Commission Wilsontown Ironworks website
Wilsontown Ironworks Heritage Project
British history online

Protected areas of South Lanarkshire
Scheduled Ancient Monuments in South Lanarkshire
Ironworks and steelworks in Scotland
Demolished buildings and structures in Scotland